Princess Sophie of Baden (Sophie Pauline Henriette Marie Amelie Luise; 7 August 1834 in Karlsruhe – 6 April 1904 in Karlsruhe), was a Princess of Baden by birth and the Princess consort of Lippe by marriage.

Life 

Sophie was the second daughter of Prince William of Baden (1792–1859) and Duchess Elisabeth Alexandrine of Württemberg (1802–1864), daughter of Duke Louis of Württemberg. Her paternal grandparents were Charles Frederick, the first Grand Duke of Baden, and his second wife, Louise Caroline Geyer von Geyersberg, Countess of Hochberg. She grew up in Karlsruhe, together with her two younger sisters, Elizabeth (1835–1891) and Leopoldine (1837–1903).

Marriage 
Sophie was married to Woldemar, Prince of Lippe (1824–1895) second son of Leopold II, Prince of Lippe (1796–1851) and Princess Emilie of Schwarzburg-Sondershausen (1800–1867) on 9 November 1858 in Karlsruhe. The marriage was childless, leading to a dispute that lasted two decades between the two lines of the House of Lippe to inherit the principality after the death of Woldemar, in 1895.

Ancestry

Notes and references

1834 births
1904 deaths
House of Zähringen
Nobility from Karlsruhe
Princesses of Baden
Princesses of Lippe